Cotton On Group is Australia's largest global retailer, known for its fashion clothing and stationery brands. As of 2020, it has over 1,500 stores in 18 countries employing 22,000 people across seven brands: Cotton On, Cotton On Kids, Cotton On Body, Factorie, Typo, Rubi, Supré, and Cotton On Foundation.

The design team in the company's Australian office, control the steps of production from merchandise planning to establishing specifications, and production is outsourced to approximately 850 suppliers and factories globally. Cotton On Group sources its materials and products from a number of locations worldwide with the majority of its suppliers being located in China, Bangladesh, India and Australia. It also works with suppliers in Sri Lanka, Hong Kong, the United States and other parts of Asia. These facilities are used for horizontal division of labour, rather than being integrated.

Cotton On is a main sponsor of the AFL Women's, the Australian rules football league for female players.

History

1990s

Cotton On was founded by Nigel Austin  in 1991, with the first store being opened in Geelong, Australia.

2000s

Cotton On Kids launched in 2004. It was followed by Cotton On Body, Factorie and Typo in 2007, and Rubi in 2008. In 2013, Cotton On acquired Australian female youth brand Supré.

Cotton On expanded internationally in 2006, with the opening of its first New Zealand store at Queensgate Shopping Centre, Lower Hutt. It now operates in 19 countries.

2010s

In December 2012 Cotton On was fined $1 million for selling highly flammable children's sleepwear misleadingly labeled as low fire danger. The discount clothing retailer, which has more than 900 outlets across the country, was fined $400,000 for selling more than 1000 nightdresses that breached Australian fire safety standards, and a further $400,000 for selling more than 1000 unsafe pairs of girls' pajamas, between September and December 2010. It was fined a further $200,000 for false and misleading labels on both sets of clothing items which claimed they were low fire danger.

In October 2016, Cotton On Group signed a 3-year contract with the AFL Women's League to be the exclusive uniform supplier for all its teams.

In July 2019, Four Corners reported Cotton On and several other Australian brands sourced cotton from Xinjiang, and that evidence linked the cotton to forced labour camps. Cotton On ran an internal investigation, and in October 2019, announced it had stopped buying cotton from Xinjiang over concerns of abuse of human rights.

In February 2019, Cotton On began selling sex toys on its Australian and New Zealand websites with a content warning.

Brands

Cotton On 

Cotton On is the main brand of the Cotton On Group. It dates its origins back to Nigel Austin's first denim jacket sale in 1988. The first Cotton On branded store opened three years later.

Cotton On Kids 

Cotton On Kids was launched in 2004, selling children's clothing, baby clothing, activewear, dress-ups, fashion accessories, swimwear, gifts, ((shoes)) and stationery. In March 2013 it launched a Free by Cotton On range for 9 to 14-year-olds.

Cotton On Body 

Cotton On Body was launched in 2007, selling underwear and sleepwear. It later expanded into swimwear and activewear.

Factorie 

Factorie is a youth fashion brand which was added to the Cotton On Group in 2007. It has since expanded internationally, and now has more than 160 stores across Australia, New Zealand and South Africa.

Rubi 

Rubi is a footwear and accessories brand launched in 2008.

Typo 

Typo is a stationery brand with stores in Australia, Asia, New Zealand, the United States and the UK. In the UK, ASOS and WHSmith also stock select Typo products.

Supré 

Supré was established in 1984, selling clothing for young women. It became part of the Cotton On Group in 2013, and had more than 1,000 workers across more than 100 retail stores in Australia and New Zealand at its peak. All Supré stores in NZ had been closed by 2020.

Lost 

Cotton On Lost was launched in late 2018, but has since been phased out. The range included travel luggage and accessories.

Stores

Australia

Cotton On Group has 288 stores in Australia.

New Zealand

There are 126 Cotton On Group stores around New Zealand.

North America, South America, and Europe

There are 154 stores in the United States, 30 stores in the United Kingdom, and 21 stores in Brazil.

Asia

Cotton On Group has stores in the following countries:

 Malaysia (81)
 Singapore (77)
 Hong Kong (5)
 Philippines (36)
 Thailand (15)
 Indonesia (32)

Middle East and Africa

Cotton On Group has stores in the following countries:

 UAE (34)
 Saudi Arabia (3)
 Oman (1)
 Jordan (2)
 South Africa (169)
 Namibia (6)
 Botswana (1)

References

External links 
 

Australian companies established in 1991
Retail companies established in 1991
Clothing brands of Australia
Clothing retailers of Australia
Companies based in Victoria (Australia)
Holding companies of Australia
Retail companies of Australia
Sportswear brands